Euptera mocquerysi is a butterfly in the family Nymphalidae. It is found in Cameroon, the Republic of the Congo and Angola (Cabinda).

References

Butterflies described in 1893
Euptera
Butterflies of Africa